The News at Bedtime is a satirical comedy series on BBC Radio 4 written by Ian Hislop and Nick Newman, writers of the satirical Private Eye magazine. The series is a spoof of news programmes, in particular shows such as The Today Programme, set in "Nurseryland", a place in which all nursery rhymes and children's stories are real. The News at Bedtime stars Jack Dee and Peter Capaldi as the main newsreaders, John Tweedledum and Jim Tweedledee. The series was broadcast over the Christmas period in 2009, from Christmas Eve 2009 to New Year's Day 2010 with a special "Year in Review" episode broadcast on 31 December 2010.

Plot
The News at Bedtime is a news programme broadcast from the magical world of Nurseryland, in which nursery rhymes and children's stories are real. The main news readers are John Tweedledum and Jim Tweedledee, who both make it clear that they dislike each other. Tweedledum sees himself as more professional, compared to Tweedledee who likes celebrity culture. Whenever Tweedledum gets annoyed by Tweedledee (or vice versa), he hits him with a toy rattle. The other main contributors to the programme are Mary Mary, the Contrary Correspondent who reports live from news stories; Peter Rabbi who presents the Thought for the Day religious slot; and weather reporter Dilly Dilly.

Production
The News at Bedtime is written by the editor of Private Eye and his close friend and sometime Private Eye contributor Nick Newman, and was inspired by a column they had written for the magazine. Newman said of the writing process that when writing for Private Eye, they find a news story and then a nursery rhyme to fit it. However, for the radio series the process was reversed, "because it's timeless, rather than topical (though there is an element of topicality about it)."

Newman also said: "It's such a mad word, nursery rhymes, when you think about it logically. There's actually quite an interesting story behind some of them. Like Humpty Dumpty - we all think it's about an egg falling off a wall. But really, Humpty Dumpty was a cannon in the English Civil War that one of the sides managed to blow up, and it fell down. So all the King's horses and all the King's men couldn't put Humpty together again - that's the origins of it. Some of these stories are true, and real news events. Part of the oral tradition of news!"

Reception
The show has been received well by critics. Tom Cole in the Radio Times wrote: "The News At Bedtime is an almost hypnologic take on the conventions of a modern radio news programme, which presents streams of dreamlike absurdity with a staunchly straight face. While the content is a little silly at times, comedy fans and news junkies will still find plenty to enjoy."

Jane Thynne said in The Independent: "you wouldn't need to be a Today aficionado to find this series a delight... All of it was pitch perfect, totally inventive and very funny."

Episodes

References
General
 
 

Specific

External links
 
 The News at Bedtime - British Comedy Guide

BBC Radio comedy programmes
2009 radio programme debuts
BBC Radio 4 programmes
Satirical radio programmes
Nursery rhymes
British satirical radio programmes